Moinabad mandal is one of the 27 mandals in Ranga Reddy district of the Indian state of Telangana. It is under the administration of Chevella revenue division and has its headquarters at Moinabad.

Demographics 

 census, the mandal had a population of 56,205. The total population constitute, 118,616 males and 121,415 females —a sex ratio of 1024 females per 1000 males. 21,333 children are in the age group of 0–6 years, of which 10,939 are boys and 10,394 are girls. The average literacy rate stands at 79.89% with 174,711 literates. In terms of population, Chilkur is the most populated and Bangaliguda is the least populated settlement in the mandal.
Peddamangalaram the famous village belongs to this mandal. Former Chief Minister of Andhra pradesh, former governor of Punjab Sri Marri Chenna Reddy, Telangana Freedom fighter , former Deputy chief minister of andhrapradesh Sri Konda Venkata Rangareddy belong to this Vilage only. 
 Sri Chilkur Balaji Temple located in this mandal. Bhaskar Medical college, VRK Medical college and Hospitals and so many engineering, MBA colleges are located.

Government

Administration 
The mandal is headed by a tahsildar.  census, the mandal has thirty two villages.

The settlements in the mandal are listed below:

See also 
 List of mandals in Telangana

References 

Mandals in Ranga Reddy district